Andrew Harrison  is an English music journalist who has worked as a staff writer for NME, Select, Mixmag, The Word, and Q, and freelance for Rolling Stone, The Face, The Guardian, The Observer and Mojo. In 2008 he coined the term landfill indie, which VICE described as referring to the "procession of homogenous [guitar] bands" that dominated the UK charts in the early-2000s.

Harrison was born in Liverpool in 1967, and entered music journalism as a teenager in the mid-1980s, at first publishing live reviews in local press before  becoming a staff writer for the NME in the late 1980s and for Select in the early 1990s. In the mid 2000s he joined and then edited The Word until February 2012, when he became editor of Q until April 2013, during a period when print magazines were undergoing double-digit year-on-year decline.

As of 2021, he continues to publish as a music critic, and hosts the "Bigmouth" and "Remainiacs" podcasts.

Career

Early career: NME, Select, Mixmag
Harrison began his career covering live gigs for the Liverpool Echo and Daily Post in the mid-1980s. His break came in 1988 when a piece of his was featured in the NME. He wrote for a number of titles and was editorial director of Mixmag and Smash Hits. He wrote extensively for NME in the late 1980s and early 1990s and interviewed Madonna, U2, Stephen Fry and others while later working freelance for titles such as Rolling Stone, The Guardian, The Observer and GQ.

Harrison is credited with coining the 2008 phrase landfill indie to describe then popular bands such as Snow Patrol, McFly, Razorlight, Maxïmo Park and The Futureheads.<ref name="JS">Rafaeli, JS. "The Definitive History of Landfill Indie in Seven Songs, Narrated by Johnny Borrell". VICE, 4 April 2016. Retrieved 17 January 2021</ref>  The term was later described by the journalist and author Simon Reynolds as "one of the decade's great memes ... it captured that sense of alarming overproduction, the gross excess of supply [of music] over demand. All these bands! Where did they come from? Why did they bother? Couldn't they tell they were shit?"Beaumont, Mark. "The term ‘landfill indie’ is pure snobbery from people who don’t know how to have fun". NME.com, 1 September 2020. Retrieved 16 January 2021

During 2008 he and Nick DeCosemo co-edited the dance-music monthly Mixmag, which two years earlier had been acquired by David Hepworth's independent publishing company Development Hell from the EMAP group.Morris, Sophie. "My Mentor: Dominic Smith on David Hepworthl". The Independent, 28 January 2008. Retrieved 17 January 2021

Harrison wrote and published the 2011 book Love Music, Love Food: The Rock Star Cookbook to aid the Teenage Cancer Trust. A coffee-table cook book with photographs by Patrice de Villiers, each dish was selected by rock stars such as Noel Gallagher and Matt Bellamy.

Q editorship
Harrison was hired in February 2012  as editor of Q magazine during a period when, according to the Guardian, "print music magazines continue to endure torrid times", and even free titles were failing to  compete against blogs and platforms dependent on online advertising. He replaced Paul Rees after the title's circulation was forecast to decline by 17% in the first half of 2012. As Harrison took over editorship, Q readership fell to 64,596 copies; a reduction described by The Guardian as "the worst performance of any music magazine in the period".Sweney, Mark. "NME and Q suffer sales declines to the tune of 20% year on year". The Guardian, 16 August 2012. Retrieved 16 January 2021

Direct reporting to publishing director Rimi Atwal of Q's parent Bauer Media Group, Harrison's brief was to "refocus" and revive the magazine, and to that end he took on a number of new journalists and launched their iPad edition, but decided against a rebranding. Under his tenure, the magazine failed to halt sales erosion, although Q was named "Magazine of the Year" at the 2012 "Record of the Day" awards. Nonetheless, he was forced out in April 2013.

2013 to present
He was a contributing editor at Esquire Weekly between September and December 2014. He hosts the podcasts "Bigmouth" (since 2016, with the writer and illustrator Sian Pattenden)Harrison, Andrew. "Inside the cosmic struggle of glam rock". New Statesman, 12 October 2016. Retrieved 16 January 2021 and "Remainiacs","Podcastology episode nine: Political pods". BBC, 4 March 2020. Retrieved 17 January 2021 which is subtitled the "no-bullshit Brexit podcast".

Personal life
His father, Stan Harrison, was a butcher who owned a premises on Blessington Road, Anfield, Liverpool, where Andrew worked from 1979 until 1984, beginning on a wage of £1 per day. He did not seek to follow his father into the trade, although it did give him a live long interest in preparing food. He has three brothers, the youngest of whom, Ian, is news editor of Mojo.

Bibliography
 Love Music Love Food: The Rock Star Cookbook: In Support of Teenage Cancer''. Quadrille, 2011.

References

External links

Bigmouth podcast
Archive of Guardian articles

English magazine editors
English music critics
English male writers
English music journalists
Year of birth missing (living people)
Living people
NME writers
Writers from Liverpool